Syb van Ottele (born 2 February 2002) is a Dutch professional footballer who plays as a centre-back for Eredivisie club Heerenveen.

Career
Born in Nijmegen, Van Ottele progressed through the NEC youth academy, which he joined in 2012. On 27 February 2018, when several European clubs wanted to recruit him, he signed his first contract with his childhood club, where he was considered one of their great prospects. Van Ottele made his professional debut for NEC in a 2–0 Eerste Divisie loss to SC Cambuur on 28 August 2020, coming on as a substitute for Édgar Barreto.

On 8 January 2021, Van Ottele signed his first professional contract with Heerenveen in the Dutch Eredivisie. Heerenveen technical director, Gerry Hamstra welcomed the signing, and described Van Ottele as a talented and versatile player who is comfortable in possession.

Honours
Netherlands U17
UEFA European Under-17 Championship: 2019

References

External links
 
 Ons Oranje Profile
 Career stats & Profile - Voetbal International

2002 births
Living people
Footballers from Nijmegen
Dutch footballers
Netherlands youth international footballers
Association football defenders
NEC Nijmegen players
SC Heerenveen players
Eerste Divisie players
Eredivisie players